Ramona is a locality located in the Castellanos Department in the Santa Fe Province, Argentina.

Twin towns
 Villanova Canavese, Italy

References

Populated places in Santa Fe Province